Miriam Sagan (born April 27, 1954, in Manhattan, New York) is a U.S. poet, as well as an essayist, memoirist and teacher. She is the author of over a dozen books, and lives and works in Santa Fe, New Mexico. She is a founding member of the collaborative press Tres Chicas Books.

A graduate of Harvard with an M.A. in creative writing from Boston University, Sagan was one of the editors of the Boston area-based Aspect Magazine with Ed Hogan. In 1980 Hogan shut Aspect down and he, Sagan and others founded Zephyr Press.

In 1982 Sagan moved from the Boston area to first San Francisco and then Santa Fe, where Sagan has made her home since 1984. She has published more than twenty books, including Searching for a Mustard Seed: A Young Widow's Unconventional Story, which won the award for best memoir from Independent Publishers for 2004; her poetry collections Rag Trade, The Widow's Coat, The Art of Love, and Aegean Doorway; and a novel, Coastal Lives. She has also edited a number of poetry anthologies.

Sagan directed the creative writing program at Santa Fe Community College and was an artist-in-residence at Everglades National Park.
After her first husband Robert Winson's untimely death, Sagan married her high school sweetheart Rich.

Works 

 
 
 
 
 
 
 
Luminosity. Duck Lake Books. 2019. 
Bluebeard's Castle. Red Mountain Press. 2019. 
A Hundred Cups Of Coffee. Tres Chicas Books. 2019. 
Star Gazing: Poems of Astronomy. Cholla Needles. 2020. 
Border Line: 101 Haiku. Cholla Needles. 2023.

References

External links 
 Bio at Tres Chicas Books
 List of poems published online
 Miriam's Well - Sagan's literary blog
 Miriam Sagan Featured poet at alittlepoetry.com

1954 births
Living people
Harvard University alumni
Boston University College of Arts and Sciences alumni
American women poets
21st-century American women